Garczegorze is a PKP railway station in Garczegorze (Pomeranian Voivodeship), Poland. It forms the western end of the disused PKP rail line 230, and lies on the PKP rail line 229 between Lębork and Łeba.

Lines crossing the station

References 
Garczegorze article at Polish Stations Database , URL accessed at 18 March 2006

Railway stations in Pomeranian Voivodeship
Lębork County